Per Erik Ahlberg is a Swedish palaeontologist working with the earliest tetrapods. He took his Ph.D. in zoology at the University of Cambridge in 1989 under English palaeontologist Jenny Clack.  He is currently professor at the Department of 
Organismal Biology, University of Uppsala.  He has collaborated with Clack on a number of projects.

He was elected to the Royal Swedish Academy of Sciences early in 2012.

References 

Swedish paleontologists
Paleozoologists
Living people
Swedish taxonomists
Academic staff of Uppsala University
20th-century Swedish zoologists
21st-century Swedish zoologists
Year of birth missing (living people)
Members of the Royal Swedish Academy of Sciences